Aurore Jéan (née Cuinet; born 25 June 1985 in Besançon) is a French cross-country skier who has competed since 2005. At the 2010 Winter Olympics in Vancouver, she finished sixth in the 4 × 5 km relay, 15th in the 30 km, 24th in the individual sprint, 32nd in the 7.5 km + 7.5 km double pursuit event, and 47th in the 10 km event.

At the FIS Nordic World Ski Championships 2009 in Liberec, Jéan finished 12th in the team sprint while not finishing the 10 km event.

Her best World Cup finish was seventh at a team sprint event in Canada in 2009 while her best individual finish was 28th at a 15 km mass start event in Slovenia also in 2009.

Cross-country skiing results
All results are sourced from the International Ski Federation (FIS).

Olympic Games

World Championships

World Cup

Season standings

Individual podiums

1 podium – (1 )

References

External links
 
 
 

1985 births
Living people
Cross-country skiers at the 2010 Winter Olympics
Cross-country skiers at the 2014 Winter Olympics
Cross-country skiers at the 2018 Winter Olympics
French female cross-country skiers
Tour de Ski skiers
Olympic cross-country skiers of France
Sportspeople from Besançon
Sportspeople from Doubs
21st-century French women